Leverett M. Kelley (1841–1924) was an American soldier and member of the 36th Illinois Volunteer Infantry Regiment who fought in the American Civil War and was awarded the Medal of Honor for forcing the surrender of a Confederate Captain at the Battle of Missionary Ridge.

After the war, he was a resident of Kane County, Illinois. He died in Washington, D.C., and was buried in Arlington National Cemetery.

References

External links
 

1841 births
1924 deaths
Union Army soldiers
United States Army Medal of Honor recipients
American Civil War recipients of the Medal of Honor
Burials at Arlington National Cemetery